is the 25th single by Japanese entertainer Miho Nakayama and a collaboration with the band Wands. Written by Show Wesugi, Nakayama, and Tetsurō Oda, the single was released on October 28, 1992, by King Records.

Background and release
"Sekaijū no Dare Yori Kitto" was co-produced by Daiko Nagato, who selected it from a stock of Tetsurō Oda's compositions. Takeshi Hayama gave it an 8-beat arrangement. The main single has Nakayama on lead vocals with Wands vocalist Show Wesugi on backing vocals. The B-side, "Sekaijū no Dare Yori Kitto (Part II)", was rearranged as a slow ballad with the vocal roles reversed.

The song was used as the theme song of the Fuji TV drama series , which also starred Nakayama. It was also used as a hold tone for a line of Sanyo cordless phones in 1995.

"Sekaijū no Dare Yori Kitto" became Nakayama's seventh No. 1 and Wands' second No. 1 on Oricon's weekly singles chart. It sold over 1,833,000 copies and was certified Quadruple Platinum by the RIAJ, making it Nakayama's biggest-selling single of her career. The song was also certified Platinum in Download Sales by the RIAJ in December 2020.

Nakayama and Wands performed the song on the 43rd Kōhaku Uta Gassen in 1992.

Other versions
Wands re-recorded the song on their 1993 album Toki no Tobira, with a rearrangement by Masao Akashi and backing vocals by Keiko Utoku. A live version of the song is included in the band's 2000 compilation album Best of Wands History.

Track listing
All lyrics are written by Show Wesugi and Miho Nakayama; all music is composed by Tetsurō Oda; all music is arranged by Takeshi Hayama.

Charts
Weekly charts

Year-end charts

Certification

Awards 
 7th Japan Gold Disc Awards: Best 5 Single Award
 12th JASRAC Awards: Gold Award

Noriko Sakai version 

"Sekaijū no Dare Yori Kitto" was covered by Noriko Sakai as her 36th single, released by Victor Entertainment on August 22, 2007. The song was used in a series of Toyota Noah commercials that year. The B-side is a re-recording of her 1995 single "Aoi Usagi", which was also composed by Oda. The single peaked at No. 44 on Oricon's singles chart This was her last single before she and her then-husband Yūichi Takasō were involved in a drug scandal in 2009.

Track listing
All music is composed by Tetsurō Oda and arranged by Takayuki Hijikata.

Charts

Other cover versions
 Sammi Cheng covered the song in Cantonese as "Only You Are Irreplaceable" (唯獨你是不可取替) in her 1997 concert Sammi Star Show 97’ Live. This version appeared in many of her albums, including Sammi vs. Sammi (2004), True Legend 101 (2013), and Unforgettable (2016).  Andy Hui has also covered the song; sometimes as a duet with Cheng.
 Ryoko Shiraishi and Junichi Miyake covered the song on the 2006 drama CD Mansuri Moe Chapter 6: Happy! Valentine.
 Hitomi Shimatani covered the song on the 2006 various artists cover album Beautiful Woman.
 Tetsurō Oda self-covered the song on his 2006 cover album Melodies and 2009 cover album Songs.
 Cover Lover Project covered the song on the 2007 cover album The Best of Bossa Covers: Seishun Pop.
 Milini Khan (Chaka Khan's daughter) covered the song in English on the 2008 various artists cover album E35: Eigo de Utaou J-pop.
 Osamu Sakata and his daughter Megumi Sakata covered the song on the 2008 various artists cover album Kodomo to Utaitai! Family Hit Songs.
 Yasushi Nakanishi covered the song on his 2008 cover album Standards 3.
 Junichi Inagaki covered the song with Keiko Terada on his 2009 duet cover album Otoko to Onna 2.
 Eric Martin and Debbie Gibson covered the song in English in two vocal arrangements; The "Mr. Vocalist Version" was included on Martin's 2010 cover album Mr. Vocalist 3, while the "Ms. Vocalist Version" was featured on Gibson's 2010 cover album Ms. Vocalist. A solo version by Martin was included on the bonus disc of his 2011 compilation album Mr. Vocalist Best.
 Hideaki Tokunaga covered the song on his 2011 compilation album Vocalist & Ballade Best.
 jyA-Me covered the song with Jun (Cliff Edge) on her 2013 cover album With Me: Duet Cover.
 Nanase Aikawa covered the song on the 2015 tribute album Treasure Box: Tetsuro Oda Songs.
 Daigo covered the song on his 2018 cover album Deing.
 Mone Kamishiraishi covered the song on her 2021 cover album Ano Uta 2.

References

External links
Miho Nakayama and Wands version

Noriko Sakai version

1992 singles
1992 songs
2007 singles
Japanese-language songs
Japanese television drama theme songs
Miho Nakayama songs
King Records (Japan) singles
Victor Entertainment singles
Songs written by Tetsurō Oda
Oricon Weekly number-one singles